Henry Isaac Stern (born April 12, 1982) is an American politician elected to the California State Senate. He is a Democrat representing the 27th district, encompassing parts of Los Angeles and Ventura counties. He was elected in November 2016. Prior to being elected to the State Senate, he was an environmental attorney and senior advisor to his predecessor Fran Pavley. He is the first millennial elected to the California State Senate.  He was also an American law lecturer at University of California, Los Angeles and UC Berkeley.

Stern has served as counsel to Congressman Henry Waxman on the House Energy & Commerce Committee to help construct clean energy projects for businesses. He has also taught civics, founded a tech incubator, and advocated for juvenile justice.

Early life and education 
Henry Isaac Stern was born to a Jewish family in Malibu, California on April 12, 1982. His father is actor Daniel Stern, who is best known for his role as Marv Merchants in the films Home Alone and Home Alone 2: Lost in New York.

A former high school and collegiate water polo player, Stern graduated from Harvard University. He went on to graduate from UC Berkeley School of Law, before becoming an environmental attorney.

California State Senate (2016–)

Election 
Henry Stern represented the Democratic Party in the 2016 race for California's 27th State Senate district against Republican Steve Fazio. On November 8, 2016, he was elected for California's 27th District State Senate.

Stern ran on a platform of five main issues in the 2016 elections. These included standing up to oil and gas companies, fighting to create incentives for companies to create "clean transportation and renewable energy infrastructure," improving the economy with small businesses, clean technology, good-paying jobs and job training, supporting education by securing funding, and creating safer communities by providing funding to local governments.

During the 2016 election, Stern was endorsed by Senator Fran Pavley, the Sierra Club, the California League of Conservation Voters, teachers and school board members from Los Angeles and Ventura county school districts, the Association of Los Angeles County Sheriffs, and the California Association of Highway Patrolmen. He was endorsed by elected officials such as President Barack Obama and Governor Jerry Brown, among many more. Publications such as the Ventura County Star and Ventura County Signal endorsed him as well.

Los Angeles County Board of Supervisors election 
Stern announced his candidacy for District 3 in the 2022 LA County Supervisor Race.

On June 22, Henry Stern conceded his race for Los Angeles County Board of Supervisors after receiving 24% of the vote in the primary.

In popular culture 
Henry's father, Daniel Stern, performed the narrative voiceover of adult Kevin Arnold for the hit television series The Wonder Years for six seasons. At the end of the show's series finale, Henry delivered the next-to-last line of the entire series when he called to his father—in voiceover--"Hey Dad, wanna play catch?" to which his father replies "I'll be right there."

References

External links 

 
 Campaign website
 Join California Henry Stern
 

Democratic Party California state senators
Living people
1982 births
Harvard University alumni
21st-century American politicians
People from Malibu, California
People from Canoga Park, Los Angeles
UC Berkeley School of Law alumni
UCLA School of Law faculty